Diliskelesi railway station was a railway station in Diliskelesi, Turkey on the Istanbul-Ankara railway. It was located just southwest of Dilovası, in the southern part of the Diliskelesi in the industrialized port area. The station was a stop on the Adapazarı Express train service; 11 daily eastbound trains and 13 daily westbound trains stopped at Diliskelesi. The station was opened in 1975, when the Turkish State Railways double-tracked the railway from Gebze to Arifiye. Diliskelesi station closed on 1 February 2012 and the platforms were demolished shortly after.

References

Railway stations in Kocaeli Province
Defunct railway stations in Turkey
Railway stations opened in 1975
Railway stations closed in 2012
1975 establishments in Turkey
2012 disestablishments in Turkey